Walter Wagner may refer to:

 Walter Wagner (footballer), German soccer player
 Walter Wagner (notary), notary who married Adolf Hitler and Eva Braun

See also
Walter Wanger (1894–1968), American film producer